This is a list of number-one songs in 1982 on the Italian charts compiled weekly by the Italian Hit Parade Singles Chart.

Chart history

Number-one artists

References

1982
1982 in Italian music
1982 record charts